An asymmetric carbon atom (chiral carbon) is a carbon atom that is attached to four different types of atoms or groups of atoms. Le Bel-van't Hoff rule states that the number of stereoisomers of an organic compound is 2n, where n represents the number of asymmetric carbon atoms (unless there is an internal plane of symmetry); a corollary of Le Bel and van't Hoff's simultaneously announced conclusions, in 1874, that the most probable orientation of the bonds of a carbon atom linked to four groups or atoms is toward the apexes of a tetrahedron, and that this accounted for all then-known phenomena of molecular asymmetry (which involved a carbon atom bearing four different atoms or groups).  Knowing the number of asymmetric carbon atoms, one can calculate the maximum possible number of stereoisomers for any given molecule as follows: 

 If n is the number of asymmetric carbon atoms then the maximum number of isomers = 2n  (Le Bel-van't Hoff rule)

As an example, malic acid has 4 carbon atoms but just one of them is asymmetric. The asymmetric carbon atom is the one attached to two carbon atoms, an oxygen atom, and a hydrogen atom. One may initially be inclined to think this atom is not asymmetric because it is attached to two carbon atoms, but because those two carbon atoms are not attached to exactly the same things, there are two different groups of atoms that the carbon atom in question is attached to, therefore making it an asymmetric carbon atom:

A tetrose with 2 asymmetric carbon atoms has 22 =  4 stereoisomers:

An aldopentose with 3 asymmetric carbon atoms has 23 =  8 stereoisomers:

An aldohexose with 4 asymmetric carbon atoms has 24 =  16 stereoisomers:

The four groups of atoms attached to the carbon atom can be arranged in space in two different ways that are mirror images of each other, and which lead to so-called left-handed and right-handed versions of the same molecule.   Molecules that cannot be superimposed on their own mirror image are said to be chiral like mirror image.

References

Stereochemistry
Jacobus Henricus van 't Hoff

de:Asymmetrisches Kohlenstoffatom